A list of films produced by the Turkish film industry in Turkey in 2015.

Highest-grossing films

See also
2015 in Turkey

References

2015
Turkey
Films
2015 in Turkish cinema